Brimah Razak (born 22 June 1987) is a Ghanaian professional footballer who plays for Spanish club CD Estepona FS as a goalkeeper.

He spent most of his career in Spain, representing Guadalajara, Mirandés and Córdoba in the Segunda División. He also played professionally in Portugal and South Africa, winning the Premier Division with Mamelodi Sundowns.

Razak appeared in two Africa Cup of Nations editions with Ghana, having made his debut in 2013.

Club career

Early career
After rarely settling as a youth player, Accra-born Razak started his professional career in January 2007 with Portugal's G.D. Chaves, playing in the country's Segunda Liga. The following year he moved down to the third division and joined Madeira's C.F. União, being first choice as they placed second their regional group – albeit without a final promotion.

Poli Ejido
In the summer of 2008, Razak returned to a club he had already represented as a youth, Polideportivo Ejido in Spain's Segunda División B. He backed up veteran Joaquín Valerio in a sole season.

Betis
Razak signed with Real Betis in 2009, but spent his first year in the same league as the previous campaign, as he appeared solely for the reserve side. He was promoted to the first team for 2010–11, with the Andalusians in the Segunda División.

Razak made his competitive debut on 1 September 2010, playing the full 90 minutes in a Copa del Rey game against UD Salamanca, a 2–1 home win.

Journeyman
Razak alternated between the second and third tier of Spanish football in the following years, representing CD Tenerife, CD Guadalajara, Córdoba CF B and CD Mirandés. On 29 July 2015 he returned to Córdoba, now being assigned to the main squad also in division two.

Mamelodi Sundowns
In August 2017, Razak moved to Mamelodi Sundowns FC; he signed a three-year contract as a free agent, stating in an interview that his reason for joining was because the club was the best in the South African Premier Division and in Africa. He made his debut on 11 September, in a 2–1 away victory over Free State Stars FC. In his only season, he acted as backup to Denis Onyango for the champions.

Razak parted ways with the Sundowns in August 2018 by mutual consent, citing a lack of playing time.

Linares Deportivo
Razak joined Linares Deportivo of the Spanish Tercera División in July 2019, on a one-year deal. He helped the team to gain promotion in his debut campaign with 75 points, 27 more than their closest challengers CD El Ejido after 29 matches before the season was truncated due to the COVID-19 pandemic. and the player was voted as the best goalkeeper after he conceded 13 goals in 25 appearances.

In August 2020, Razak extended his contract with the club by another year. In 2020–21, he helped the side reach the promotion play-offs for the first time in 13 years; they lost at that stage, but were promoted to the newly formed Primera División RFEF. He was selected for the Team of the Season and voted best goalkeeper, having kept 15 clean sheets.

International career
Razak earned the first of his 27 caps for Ghana on 14 August 2013, appearing in a 2–2 friendly draw in Turkey as a 46th-minute substitute. He was part of the squad that appeared in the 2015 Africa Cup of Nations, being first choice as the nation reached the final; in the decisive match, against the Ivory Coast, he missed his penalty shootout attempt in an eventual 9–8 loss.

Razak also started in the 2017 edition, a fourth-place finish in Gabon. Following criticism of his performances, he posted a video on Facebook that was perceived as disrespectful towards his compatriots, and was handed a $2,500 fine by the Ghana Football Association.

Personal life
Razak fathered two children, son Nasser and daughter Atu, referring to them as being the ''biggest idols and his life''. He idolised Ghanaian international goalkeeper Sammy Adjei, who won many laurels whilst playing for Accra Hearts of Oak S.C. and was also remembered for the 1999 FIFA World Youth Championship quarter-final tie against Spain.

Career statistics

International

Honours

Mamelodi Sundowns
South African Premier Division: 2017–18

Linares Deportivo
Tercera División: 2019–20

Ghana
Africa Cup of Nations runner-up: 2015

Individual
Segunda División B Best Goalkeeper: 2020–21
Segunda División B Team of the season: 2020–21
Tercera División Best Goalkeeper: 2019–20

References

External links

1987 births
Living people
Ghanaian footballers
Footballers from Accra
Association football goalkeepers
Liga Portugal 2 players
Segunda Divisão players
G.D. Chaves players
C.F. União players
Segunda División players
Segunda División B players
Tercera División players
Primera Federación players
Segunda Federación players
Polideportivo Ejido footballers
Betis Deportivo Balompié footballers
Real Betis players
CD Tenerife players
CD Guadalajara (Spain) footballers
Córdoba CF B players
CD Mirandés footballers
Córdoba CF players
Linares Deportivo footballers
South African Premier Division players
Mamelodi Sundowns F.C. players
Ghana international footballers
2015 Africa Cup of Nations players
2017 Africa Cup of Nations players
Ghanaian expatriate footballers
Expatriate footballers in Germany
Expatriate footballers in Portugal
Expatriate footballers in Spain
Expatriate soccer players in South Africa
Ghanaian expatriate sportspeople in Germany
Ghanaian expatriate sportspeople in Portugal
Ghanaian expatriate sportspeople in Spain
Ghanaian expatriate sportspeople in South Africa